Electric Banana Band is a Swedish children's music/rock music band formed in 1980.

History
Electric Banana Band was formed as a response to the success of Trazan & Banarne, a highly acclaimed Swedish children's television programme, also produced by two of the band members, Lasse Åberg and Klasse Möllberg. The band takes on a jungle theme, partially borrowing elements from The Phantom, a widely popular comic in Sweden, as well as Tarzan. Their jungle theme included both their costumes, designed to reflect the nicknames of the lineup, as well as the songs, which usually had nature-inspired themes.

Despite being mainly a studio band, the band does some occasional touring, mainly at free events as the members of the band are not dependent upon the success of the band.

In the 2003 film Smala Sussie the band was mentioned several times and became somewhat of a comedic plot element. 

The band competed in Melodifestivalen 2006 with their song Kameleont (Chameleon).

Members
Lasse Åberg - Lead Vocals
Klasse Möllberg - Lead Vocals 
Janne Schaffer - Guitar
Peter Ljung - Keyboards
Mårgan Höglund - Drums
Jouni Haapala - Percussion
Thobias Gabrielsson - Bass guitar
Riltons Vänner - Vocals

Past members
Stefan Blomquist - Keyboard
Per Lindvall - Drums
Åke Sundqvist - Percussion
Christer Jansson - Percussion
Tommy Cassemar - Bass
Sven Lindvall - Bass
Magnus and Henrik Rongedal - Vocals
Marianne Flynner - Vocals
Maria Wickman - Vocals
Annica Boller - Vocals

Media

Albums
1981 - Electric Banana Band
1984 - Livet i regnskogarna
1993 - The Golden Years 1981-1986 (compilation)
1998 - Electric Banana Tajm (compilation)
2000 - Den Hela Människan (music from the film Hälsoresan, together with Björn J:son Lindh)
2000 - Nu e're djur igen
2005 - Electric Banana Bands och Trazan & Banarnes bästa (compilation)
2006 - Kameleont (compilation)
2006 - Banankontakt - Musikaltajm! (compilation, together with Malmö Operaorkester)
2014 - Schyssta Bananer (compilation)

Books
In 1999 Electric Banana Band released a song book called Sångtajm with sheet music on many  songs from the albums.

Film and television
1980 - Trazan Apansson & Banarne
1980 - Trazan Apansson-E' bananerna fina?
1980 - Trazan Apansson-Djungelmums
1981 - Biotajm med Trazan & Banarne
1982 - Videotajm med Trazan & Banarne
1998 - Electric Banana Band the Movie - djungelns kojigaste rulle

References

External links 
 Official site
 Official Facebook page

Musical groups established in 1980
Melodifestivalen contestants
Swedish rock music groups